The Merger is a 2018 Australian drama comedy film based on comedian Damian Callinan's critically acclaimed solo show of the same name. The film explores the decline of a cash-strapped Aussie Rules rural footy club and the recruitment of refugees to keep the club viable. The tagline for this film is "If they can play, they can stay."

Cast
 Damian Callinan as Troy Carrington
 John Howard as Bull Barlow
 Kate Mulvany as Angie Barlow
 Fayssal Bazzi as Sayyid
 Rafferty Grierson as Neil Barlow
 Nick Cody as Goober
 Josh McConville as Snapper
 Angus McLaren as Carpet Burn
 Penny Cook as Fran Barlow
 Stephen Hunter as Neville
 Ben Knight as Harpo
 Harry Tseng as Tou Pou
 Sahil Saluja as Suresh
 Francis Kamara as Didier
 Zenia Starr as Navina
 Aaron Gocs as Porterhouse
 Michelle Brasier as Gretchen 
 Haya Arzidin as Fazela
 Gavin Baskerville as Gavin / Head Morris Dancer / Medieval Performer 
 Michael Morley as Morris Dancer /  Medieval Performer / Goal Umpire

Synopsis
The rural New South Wales town of Bodgy Creek is struggling: with drought, job scarcity (after the timber mill was shut down), and with racism. The film focuses on the Roosters (a local football team) which is in financial strife. The team faces a dilemma - either they will have to merge with another club or fold.

Living a hermit-like existence on the town's fringe, former football star Troy Carrington (Damian Callinan), is coaxed into rescuing the team after striking up an unlikely friendship with young Neil (Raffety Grierson). Neil, who is struggling with the recent loss of his father, decides to trust Troy despite the fact that he is a disgraced local who most people blame for the town's decline (he led a protest to close down the timber mill, leading to mass job losses.) Thus, Troy is given a chance for redemption – a second go at saving the town he allegedly destroyed.

Teaming up with Neil's mum Angie (Kate Mulvany) who runs a nearby refugee support centre, they unite to recruit the new arrivals to save the team and take the community on a journey of change. But for some, like Neil's grandfather and Club President, Bull (John Howard) and ‘star’ player Carpet Burn (Angus McLaren), it's more change than they're willing to take. Bull wants to stick with tradition and is angered by the fact that his daughter-in-law, Angie wants to change it up and make a move for the future. He organises a petition to protest against refugees joining the team and even arranges for protesters to picket at training.

The film is a commentary on Australia's refugee policy and the racism it generates. Through hearing characters like Tou Pou (a refugee from Laos), Sayyid (a Syrian refugee) and Didier (who fled from Burundi) speak about their experiences, the other players begin to empathise with their experience. In the resolution of the film, the players (and the broader community) learn to accept people for who they are and what they can offer a community. Viable employment is also found for many of the skilled migrants as Angie and Troy discover that a funding grant exists to encourage organisations to employ refugees as builders (to fix the clubhouse which has been condemned due to asbestos.)

According to Film Ink "The Merger is busting with great gags and loveable characters, and its messages about tolerance and the value of mateship are timely and well placed."

Production and release
The movie was filmed in Wagga Wagga and environs, New South Wales. Production was completed in 2017 and the film was released on 30 August 2018 to Australian and New Zealand theatres.

Soundtrack

References

External links
The Official site

The Conversation review - Inside the story: The Merger - a sports film as a vehicle for social change
Film Ink review
The Guardian review - The Merger review – political twist to familiar tale of small-town football team
Beyond the Boundary: An Interview with The Merger director Mark Grentell
Umbrella Entertainment - The Merger

2018 films
2010s sports comedy-drama films
Australian sports comedy-drama films
Australian rules football films
Films shot in New South Wales
2010s English-language films